The FAST protocol (FIX Adapted for STreaming) is a technology standard developed by FIX Protocol Ltd., specifically aimed at optimizing data representation on the network. It is used to support high-throughput, low latency data communications between financial institutions. 

In particular, it is a technology standard that offers significant compression capabilities for the transport of high-volume market data feeds and ultra low latency applications.

History

Timeline
 2004          Market Data optimization Working Group (“mdowg”) was formed
 2005          Proof of Concept (“POC”) project
 2006          FAST 1.0 released
 2007          FAST 1.1 released
 2009          FAST 1.2 proposed

In November 2004, Mike Cormack (then CEO Archipelago Holding) spoke at the FPL (FIX Protocol Ltd) conference in New York regarding a call for action to meet the challenges of the increased market data volumes. The increasing volumes of market data were causing delays, preventing market data from reaching traders in a timely fashion, thus disrupting their ability to trade. The classic FIX tag value format was considered to be too verbose and had a high processing overhead. A working group was formed within FPL shortly after the conference.

Current version of FAST
The approved standard is currently at version 5.0, and is used in commercially available products.  There are Open Source implementations of the Protocol available.

Exchanges that have adopted FAST
NYSE Archipelago
CME Group (CME)
International Securities Exchange (ISE)
NasdaqOMX
Eurex
Xetra
Bombay Stock Exchange (BSE Ltd, India)
BATS
ICAP
OPRA
B3
Nordic Growth Market (NGM)
Moscow Exchange (MOEX)
Shanghai Stock Exchange (SSE, China)

Open source implementations
Source code for implementations of the FAST Specification are available from the following sources:

See also
 Simple Binary Encoding is considered to be the successor to the FAST protocol
 List of electronic trading protocols

References

External links
FAST protocol's official homepage and list of proof of concept sponsors.

Internet Protocol based network software